Serie Diamante is the fifth hits album by iconic Mexican pop singer Verónica Castro. It was released in 2008 by Peerless Records celebrating their 75th anniversary.

Track listing
 "Yofo Tefe"  
 "Mi Cumple Años Contigo"  
 "Yo Quisiera Señor Locutor"  (Fabiola Del Carmen)  
 "Mi Pequeño Ciclon" (Manolo Marroqui)
 "Soy Celosa"   (Fabiola Del Carmen)
 "Aprendí a Llorar"  (Lolita de la Colina)
 "Yo Creo en el Mañana"
 "San Francisco De Asis"  
 "El Deslocón"  (Manolo Marroqui)
 "Cantando Por Telefono" 
 "Andale Compadre"   
 "El Malas Mañas"  
 "Pobre Gorrión"  (Esperanza Acevedo)
 "Hasta Que Te Perdí"  (Roberto Belester)
 "Porque Tu Ya Eras Mio"

2008 compilation albums
Verónica Castro albums